Coryneopsis is a fungus genus. Index Fungorum considers it a synonym of Seimatosporium.

Species 
 Coryneopsis canina
 Coryneopsis cisticola
 Coryneopsis corni-albae
 Coryneopsis foliicola
 Coryneopsis henriquesiana
 Coryneopsis lirella
 Coryneopsis microsticta
 Coryneopsis rubi
 Coryneopsis tamaracis otherwise Coryneopsis tamaricis
 Coryneopsis viburni

References

External links 
 
 mycobank.org

Xylariales